Chen Bangping (born 24 May 1976) is a Chinese handball player. She competed in the women's tournament at the 1996 Summer Olympics.

References

1976 births
Living people
Chinese female handball players
Olympic handball players of China
Handball players at the 1996 Summer Olympics
Place of birth missing (living people)